Michael Raj is a 1987 Indian Tamil-language action drama film directed by V. C. Guhanathan and produced by D. Ramanaidu, starring Raghuvaran in lead role, supported by Madhuri, Sarath Babu and Baby Shalini. It was released on 5 December 1987. The film was remade in Telugu as Brahma Puthrudu with Shalini reprising her role and in Hindi as Rakhwala.

Plot 

Michael Raj is the story of an honest man who had to take the route of action to erase the corruption and crime happening around him.

Cast 
 Raghuvaran
 Madhuri
 Sarath Babu
 Charle
 Baby Shalini
 Senthil

Soundtrack 
Soundtrack was composed by Chandrabose. All songs written by Mu. Metha.

Reception 
The Indian Express wrote, "There is crude rabblerousing with anti-rich bombast, all in keeping with the meaningless socialistic pattern(n) of filmy rhetoric".

References

External links 
 

1980s action drama films
1980s Tamil-language films
1987 films
Films directed by V. C. Guhanathan
Films scored by Chandrabose (composer)
Indian action drama films
Suresh Productions films
Tamil films remade in other languages